Joana Filipa Gaspar Silva Marchão (born 24 October 1996) is a Portuguese professional footballer who plays as a defender for Italian Serie A club Parma and the Portugal women's national team. She has previously played for CA Ouriense and Sporting CP.

Club career
In July 2022, Marchão left Sporting CP after six years, signing a two-year contract with Serie A newcomers Parma.

International career
Marchão has been capped for the Portugal national team, appearing for the team during the 2019 FIFA Women's World Cup qualifying cycle.

International goals

References

External links
 
 
 
 
 Joana Marchão at Sporting CP 

1996 births
Living people
Portuguese women's footballers
Portugal women's international footballers
Women's association football defenders
Campeonato Nacional de Futebol Feminino players
Sporting CP (women's football) players
People from Abrantes
Atlético Ouriense players
Sportspeople from Santarém District
UEFA Women's Euro 2022 players
Parma Calcio 2022 players
Portuguese expatriate sportspeople in Italy
Serie A (women's football) players
Expatriate women's footballers in Italy
Portuguese expatriate women's footballers